Brendan Burke (born November 12, 1982 in Hopedale, Massachusetts) is an American soccer coach and former player who is currently an assistant coach for Major League Soccer club Houston Dynamo FC. During his playing career, he mainly played as a center back for several teams in the Premier Development League before beginning his head coaching career at age 25 for Reading United where he was very successful.

Player
Born in Hopedale, Massachusetts 1982, Burke later graduated from Saint John's High School in Shrewsbury in 2001. In his senior year, he scored 16 goals and 17 assists and was named the 2000 Central Massachusetts Player of the Year. He then attended Boston College where he played sparingly until his senior year in 2005, when he played 12 games. During his college years, he first played for Worcester Kings for whom he scored his first goal in a 4-1 loss to against Brooklyn Knights on June 25, 2003. in the Premier Development League. He would later play for the Cape Cod Crusaders also in the Premier Development League.

After his graduation, he had a brief stint with Sligo Rovers in League of Ireland Premier Division before returning to play in the Premier Development League with Reading United in 2007. It would be his last season as a player before he embarked on his coaching career.

Coach

Reading United and Philadelphia Union Reserves
In 2008, Burke began his coaching career at age 25 for Reading United in the Premier Development League as part of his six-year reign with the team. He led the team to a 1st-place finish in the Mid Atlantic Division with an 11-3-2 regular season record. In the playoffs, his team reached the League Semi-Final before losing to Laredo Heat.

In 2009, he led the team to another Mid Atlantic Division first place regular season finish with its 13-1-2 record, which was also the best regular season record in the entire league. In the playoffs, his team lost its opening round game against Cary Clarets in the Division Final.

In 2010, Burke once again led his team to a Mid Atlantic first place regular season with a 10-2-4 record. In the playoffs, the team ended up placing 4th overall in the league after losing to Baton Rouge Capitals in a penalty kick tiebreaker.

In 2011, Burke kept his Reading United coaching position while joining the team's Major League Soccer affiliate, Philadelphia Union. He would be the head coach of the Philadelphia Union Reserves as well as serving as an assistant coach of the first team. His appointment made him the youngest assistant coach in Major League Soccer when he joined the Union. In his debut as the Philadelphia Union Reserves coach in 2011, the team finished 2-7-1 in last place in the Eastern Division. For his season with Reading United, the team finished 12-2-2 and came in 2nd place in the Mid-Atlantic Division while losing to Jersey Express in the Division Qualification game for the playoffs.

In 2012 which was the last season of the MLS Reserve League, his Philadelphia Union Reserves finished 4-4-2 for 3rd place in the Eastern Division. He would also lead Reading United to an 11-3-2 regular season record that was good for 2nd place in the Mid Atlantic Division. In the playoffs, the team was ousted by Carolina Dynamo in the Eastern Conference Semi-Final.

In his final season with Reading United in 2013, Burke led the team to a 3rd-place finish in the Mid Atlantic Division with an 8-5-1 record. In the playoffs, the team was again ousted in the Eastern Conference Semi-Final - this time by Ottawa Fury.

Northeastern Huskies
In early 2014, Burke left his positions with Philadelphia Union and Reading United to pursue coaching opportunities closer to his native Massachusetts. On April 14, 2014, he would take the position of Associate Head Coach of the men's soccer team at Northeastern University. He would remain in that position until October 29.

Bethlehem Steel FC
2015 when he became the first head coach of Bethlehem Steel FC, the reserve team owned and operated by the Philadelphia Union that competed in the United Soccer League. The Steel finished the first season missing out on the playoffs but gave ample playing time to young players from the academy.

Ahead of the 2018 season, Burke's contract option was picked up and signed a multi-year extension to continue coaching Steel FC. The 2018 season was the most successful to date with Burke's club winning its first postseason match, earning its highest seeding and setting single season records for wins (14) and goals (58).

Prior to the start of the 2020 season, the club re-branded as Philadelphia Union II and announced that Burke had transitioned to Head of Recruitment Operations for Union II and the first team, being succeeded by Sven Gartung as head coach.

Colorado Springs Switchbacks FC
In December 2020, it was announced that Burke was appointed head coach of Colorado Springs Switchbacks FC in the USL Championship.  In 2021, his first season with the club, he brought the Switchbacks to the playoffs for the first time since 2016 and a 5th place finish overall in the Western Conference.  Burke was named a 2021 USL Championship Coach of the Year Finalist for his efforts.  Burke left Colorado Springs in January 2023.

Houston Dynamo FC
Burke joined the coaching staff of Major League Soccer club Houston Dynamo on January 13, 2023.

Coaching record

Note: Includes all competitive USL and playoff matches. Playoff matches decided by penalties officially recorded as draws.

References

1982 births
Living people
People from Hopedale, Massachusetts
Sportspeople from Worcester County, Massachusetts
Soccer players from Massachusetts
Association football defenders
Boston College Eagles men's soccer players
Worcester Kings players
Cape Cod Crusaders players
Sligo Rovers F.C. players
Reading United A.C. players
American soccer coaches
Philadelphia Union II coaches
Philadelphia Union non-playing staff
Northeastern Huskies men's soccer coaches
Colorado Springs Switchbacks FC coaches
Houston Dynamo FC non-playing staff
American expatriate soccer players
Expatriate association footballers in Ireland
American expatriate sportspeople in Ireland
USL League Two coaches